The Meredith Music Festival (otherwise known simply as Meredith or MMF) is a three-day outdoor music festival held every December at the "Supernatural Amphitheatre", a natural amphitheatre located on private farmland near the town of Meredith in Victoria, Australia. A self-funded, non-commercial event that was first held in 1991, the festival spawned Golden Plains, a music festival that takes place over the Labour Day long weekend in March.

At the APRA Music Awards of 2020, the festival won Licensee of the Year Award.

The upcoming 2022 festival is the first to occur in 3 years, following no festival since 2019.

Description
The festival is held on a private property owned by the family of one of the organisers, Chris Nolan near the town of Meredith. Since the Nolans own the site, permanent infrastructure has been built including showers, compost toilets, and recycled water with the surrounding areas set up for usage of tents, vans, caravans or motorhomes. The culture and music of the festival reflects the strength, and diversity of the Melbourne and surrounding music scene. Warren Ellis (musician) (Dirty Three / Grinderman) referred to it as "the world's best festival" in a recent interview.

Artist lineup

Attractions
 The Meredith Gift (a reference to the Stawell Gift) is a nude running race, with the chance to win The Golden Jocks trophy.
 The Pink Flamingo Bar, an ever-popular cocktail bar
Eric's Terrace, cocktail bar with a large selection of food and drinks. 
 A sportsfield which includes the Meredith Eye Ferris wheel.
 The Ecoplex Cinema displays both short and feature-length films, including outdated informational films, advertisements and television shows intended to humour the audience.

Ticketing
The event is usually "sold out" before the date. Ticketing is implemented via a system which sees the first allocation distributed through a 'Subscriber Ticket Ballot' - allowing half of the total allocation of tickets randomly distributed to 'subscribers' already on MMF's email list. Subscribers are notified in August and need to purchase their tickets within a set period of time.

The second allocation is sold in record stores in Melbourne, Geelong, Ballarat and the Surf Coast as has been the case in previous years. These go on sale after the Ballot closes.  The third allocation is distributed online.

List of Meredith Music Festival lineups by year

This is a list of Meredith Music Festival lineups by year:

Awards

Music Victoria Awards
The Music Victoria Awards are an annual awards night celebrating Victorian music. They commenced in 2006. The award for Best Festival was introduced in 2013.

! 
|-
| Music Victoria Awards of 2013
| Meredith Music Festival
| Best Festival
| 
|rowspan="6"| 
|-
| Music Victoria Awards of 2014
| Meredith Music Festival
| Best Festival
| 
|-
| Music Victoria Awards of 2016
| Meredith Music Festival
| Best Festival
| 
|-
| Music Victoria Awards of 2017
| Meredith Music Festival
| Best Festival
| 
|-
| Music Victoria Awards of 2018
| Meredith Music Festival
| Best Festival
| 
|-
| Music Victoria Awards of 2019
| Meredith Music Festival
| Best Festival
| 
|-

See also

Golden Plains Festival

References

External links

 Meredith Music Festival

Music festivals in Australia
Festivals in Victoria (Australia)
Clothing-optional events
1991 establishments in Australia
Music festivals established in 1991
APRA Award winners